Events in the year 1974 in the Republic of India.

Incumbents
 President of India – V. V. Giri (until 24 August), Fakhruddin Ali Ahmed (after 24 August)
 Prime Minister of India – Indira Gandhi
 Chief Justice of India – Ajit Nath Ray

Governors
 Andhra Pradesh – Khandubhai Kasanji Desai 
 Assam – L. P. Singh 
 Bihar – Ramchandra Dhondiba Bhandare 
 Gujarat – Kambanthodath Kunhan Vishwanatham 
 Haryana – Birendra Narayan Chakraborty 
 Himachal Pradesh – S. Chakravarti
 Jammu and Kashmir – L. K. Jha 
 Karnataka – Mohanlal Sukhadia
 Kerala – N. N. Wanchoo 
 Madhya Pradesh – Satya Narayan Sinha 
 Maharashtra – Ali Yavar Jung 
 Manipur – L.P. Singh 
 Meghalaya – L.P. Singh 
 Nagaland – L.P. Singh 
 Odisha – 
 until 20 August: Basappa Danappa Jatti 
 21 August-25 October: Gati Krushna Misra
 starting 25 October: Akbar Ali Khan
 Punjab – Mahendra Mohan Choudhry 
 Rajasthan – Sardar Jogendra Singh 
 Tamil Nadu – Kodardas Kalidas Shah 
 Tripura – L. P. Singh 
 Uttar Pradesh – Akbar Ali Khan (until 25 October), Marri Chenna Reddy (starting 25 October)
 West Bengal – Anthony Lancelot Dias

Events
National income - 793,779 million
 5 January – Worli riots occurred in the chawl in the Worli neighborhood of Mumbai. The tensions prevailed till April.
 January – May smallpox epidemic in East India.
 19 February - Drillship Sagar Samrat struck oil at Bombay High, 160 km off the shore.
 16 March – Navnirman Andolan (Re-construction movement) a socio-political movement started in 1973 December in Gujarat by students and middle-class against economic crisis and corruption in public life. The movement ended with the dissolution of the elected government of Chimanbhai Patel.
 18 March – Bihar Movement started as a movement by students in Bihar led by the veteran Gandhian socialist Jayaprakash Narayan, against misrule and corruption in the Government of Bihar.
 25 March – Gaura Devi and 27 women confronted loggers in Chamoli district in connection with Chipko movement.
 28 March - Minister of Food and Agriculture Fakhruddin Ali Ahmed announced that Government of India has decided to scrap take over of wholesale  wheat distribution.
 8 May – A railway strike started by 1.7 million workers of Indian Railways. The strike lasted for 20 days till 27 May 1974 and was the largest recorded industrial action in the world.
 18 May – Under project Smiling Buddha, India successfully detonates its first nuclear weapon in the Thar Desert, and becomes the sixth nation to do so.
 28 June - Sirima–Gandhi Pact signed to solve the statelessness of Sri Lankan Tamils.
 5 July - Colaba area of Bombay registers intense rainfall of 57.5 cms in 24 hours.
 11–17 November - 1974 Indian Open held at Bombay.

Births
1 January – Abha Dawesar, novelist.
9 January – Farhan Akhtar, actor.
7 January – Varun Badola, actor.
10 January – Hrithik Roshan, actor.
25 February – Divya Bharti, actress (died 1993).
8 March – Fardeen Khan, actor.
22 April – Chetan Bhagat, novelist.
23 April – Shwetha Menon, actor.
20 May – Shiboprosad Mukherjee, film director, writer and actor. 
28 May – Mayur Puri, screenwriter, lyricist, actor, filmmaker.
30 May  Mohan Raja, film director.
7 June – Mahesh Bhupathi, tennis player.
22 June – Joseph Vijay, actor and playback singer.
22 June  Devayani, actress.
25 June – Karisma Kapoor, actress.
15 July – Neikezhakuo Kengurüse, kargil hero. (died 1999).
5 August – Kajol, actress.
9 September – Vikram Batra, Indian Army-KARGIL HERO. (died 1999).
25 September  AR Murugadoss, film director.
23 October – Aravind Adiga, journalist and author, 2008 Man Booker Prize winner.

1 November – V. V. S. Laxman, cricketer.
9 November – Manav Gohil, television actor
19 December – MVP, Writer & Author.
21 December – Sanjiv Chaturvedi, Indian Forest Service officer.
25 December  Nagma, actress and politician.

Deaths
4 February – Satyendra Nath Bose, physicist (b. 1894).
11 February – Ghantasala, Telugu Play Back Singer (b.1922).
23 September – Jayachamaraja Wodeyar Bahadur, last Maharaja of Mysore, philosopher, musicologist, political thinker and philanthropist (b. 1919).
6 October – V. K. Krishna Menon, nationalist and politician (b. 1897).
16 October – Chembai, Carnatic music singer (b. 1895).
16 October – Edasseri Govindan Nair, poet, playwright and essayist (b. 1906).
J. P. Chandrababu, comedian-actor, singer and dancer (b. 1926).
Kshetresa Chandra Chattopadhyaya, scholar of Sanskrit (b. 1896).
Sucheta Kriplani, freedom fighter, politician and in Uttar Pradesh, became first woman to be elected Chief Minister of a state (b. 1908).
Matthew Pothen Thekaekara, scientist (b. 1914).

See also 
 List of Bollywood films of 1974

References

 
India
Years of the 20th century in India